State Highway 71 (SH 71) is a Texas state highway that runs . The northern terminus is at US 87 and US 377 south of Brady and its southern terminus is at SH 35 near Blessing.  This highway is designated the "10th Mountain Division Highway" from SH 95 to Interstate 35.

History
SH 71 was originally designated on August 21, 1923 from Austin to Columbus, replacing SH 3D and the western half of SH 3A. On June 8, 1925, SH 71 was extended to Midfield, though this was not effective until 1926. On March 19, 1928, it extended south to its current end. On June 21, 1938, SH 71 Spur was designated in Columbus. In 1935, U.S. Highway 290 was codesignated along the stretch from Austin to Bastrop, dropping SH 71 from this section completely on September 26, 1939. SH 71 Spur was renumbered as Spur 52. On May 23, 1951, this section was restored when US 290 was rerouted farther north. On October 24, 1955, SH 71 was signed, but not designated along Ranch to Market Road 93 to Llano. On October 31, 1965, the highway was extended to its current designation over the cancelled Ranch to Market Road 93 and Ranch to Market Road 734. On February 16, 1982, SH 71 was relocated in Columbus.

Austin
Through Austin, SH 71 is known as Ben White Boulevard and is one of Austin's newest freeways. Sections have opened regularly since 1996, when the first section west of Interstate 35 was opened. A 5-level stack was completed at Interstate 35 in December 2011, and the freeway east of Interstate 35 to Austin-Bergstrom International Airport was completed in 2014. Construction commenced in 2015 east of US 183 (Bastrop Freeway) where a section of SH 71 to the SH 130 tollway has been converted into a tollway with a two lane bridge crossing SH 130. 

Major displacements of commercial properties were required to build the Austin expansions. The section at the western end required many more business displacements. The new freeway features depressed sections, elevated sections, and partial stack interchanges.

Business routes
SH 71 has two business routes.

La Grange business loop

Business State Highway 71-E (Bus. SH 71-E) is a business loop that runs through La Grange. The road was designated in 1991 upon completion of a bypass around the city.

Columbus business loop

Business State Highway 71-F (Bus. SH 71-F) is a business loop that runs through Columbus. The city was bypassed on February 16, 1982, and the original route was designated as Loop 329. The route received the Bus. SH 71-F designation on June 21, 1990.

Junction list

References

071
Transportation in Austin, Texas
Transportation in Bastrop County, Texas
Transportation in Blanco County, Texas
Transportation in Burnet County, Texas
Transportation in Colorado County, Texas
Transportation in Fayette County, Texas
Transportation in Llano County, Texas
Transportation in Mason County, Texas
Transportation in Matagorda County, Texas
Transportation in McCulloch County, Texas
Transportation in San Saba County, Texas
Transportation in Travis County, Texas
Transportation in Wharton County, Texas